The Journey of August King is a 1995 American drama film directed by John Duigan based on the 1971 novel of the same name by John Ehle, who also wrote the screenplay. It stars Jason Patric and Thandiwe Newton. 

The film had its world premiere as the closing film of the 52nd edition of the Venice Film Festival on  September 9, 1995; it was later screened at the Toronto International Film Festival on September 14, 1995, and at the Chicago International Film Festival on October 13, 1995. It was released in theaters in the United States on November 10, 1995.

Cast
Jason Patric as August King
Thandiwe Newton as Annalees Williamsburg (credited as Thandie Newton)
Larry Drake as Olaf Singletary
Sam Waterston as Mooney Wright
Eric Mabius as Hal Wright
Maya Angelou voices as the film narrator
Sarah-Jane Wylde as Ida Wright
Muse Watson as Zimmer
John Doman as Bolton
Andy Stahl as Harrison (as Andrew Stahl)
Danny Nelson as Felix
Collin Wilcox-Paxton as Mina
Dean Rader-Duval as Gabriel (as Dean Rader Duvall)
Billy Ray Reynolds as Ben
Marlus Harding as Sims (as Marlus C. Harding)
Lisa Roberts Gillan as Meg (as Lisa Roberts)
John Burnett Hall as Travis
Roy Bush Laughter as Tom
A. Duncan Shirley III as Porter
Chase Conley as Harry (Son)
Nesbitt Blaisdell as McCabe
Graham Paul as Wade
Rich Valliere as Jeffrey
Mitch Mulkey as Phillips
Kenny Jones as Ed (as Ken Paul Jones)
Dale Dickey as Jenny
Lee Norris as Silver Boy
Dean Whitworth as Smith
Blaque Fowler as Mr. Tavish
Mark Joy as Mark

See also
 List of films featuring slavery

References

External links

1995 films
1990s English-language films
Films directed by John Duigan
Films about slavery
1995 drama films
Miramax films
Films set in North Carolina
Films based on American novels